Astele monile, common name the Australian necklace, is a species of sea snail, a marine gastropod mollusk in the family Calliostomatidae.

Some authors place this taxon in the subgenus Astele (Astele)

Description
The size of the shell varies between 15 mm and 25 mm. The shell has an erectly conical shape but is rather swollen at the base. It is transparent white, encircled by a necklace of violet spots. The whorls are concavely sloping, spirally ridged. These ridges are smooth with the two basal ridges more prominent. The necklace of violet spots has an exceedingly pretty appearance on the delicate transparent ground of the shell.

Distribution
This marine species is endemic to Australia and  occurs off Western Australia, Northern Territory and Queensland.

References

 Wilson, B.R. & Gillett, K. 1971. Australian shells: illustrating and describing 600 species of marine gastropods found in Australian waters. Sydney : Reed Books 168 pp.

External links
 
 Jansen, P. 2000. A preliminary checklist of the recent Australian Trochidae

monile
Gastropods described in 1863